The 2nd Division was a naval formation of the British Home Fleet it was formed before First World War in March 1909 until May 1912.

History
In March 1909 following a re-organisation of the British Fleet the Channel Fleet was absorbed by the Home Fleet, while the former Channel Fleet became the Home Fleet's first and second divisions. These new divisions were made up of an 8-12 ship battle squadron that included either dreadnought battleships or pre-dreadnought battleships all remaining components of the former Home Fleet as it then stood became the third and fourth divisions that was a single command under a vice-admiral. The third and fourth division was assigned to major home commands as a reserve force.

The 2nd Battle Squadron of the 2nd Division contained 10 to 12 older battleships, the 2nd Cruiser Squadron was formed using armored cruisers whilst the 2nd Destroyer Flotilla had a total of 4 scout cruiser leaders assigned to during its it plus 21 other destroyers of different classes.

Vice-Admirals Commanding 2nd Division
Post holders included:

Rear Admirals in the 2nd Division
Post holders included:

Components
Included:

Footnotes

References
 
 Mackie, Gordon. "Royal Navy Senior Appointments from 1865" (PDF). gulabin.com. Gordon Mackie, p. 199. December 2017.

 

Royal Navy divisions
Military units and formations established in 1909
Military units and formations disestablished in 1912